G with hook (majuscule: Ɠ, minuscule: ɠ) is a letter of the extended Latin alphabet.  In the International Phonetic Alphabet, its small caps form represents the voiced uvular implosive and its lowercase form represents the voiced velar implosive. Because it occurs in the orthographies of some African languages, including some unofficial orthographies of Fula, it is included in the African reference alphabet.

Unicode
In Unicode, the majuscule Ɠ is encoded in the Latin Extended-B block at U+0193 and the minuscule ɠ is encoded at U+0260.

See also
Writing systems of Africa (section on Latin script)

Phonetic transcription symbols
Latin letters with diacritics